Tom Carvel (born Athanasios Karvelas; July 14, 1906 – October 21, 1990) was a Greek-born American businessman and entrepreneur known for the invention and promotion of soft ice cream in the northeastern United States. He was the founder of the Carvel brand and franchise.

Early business career
Carvel began selling ice cream out of his truck in 1929 in Hartsdale, New York. On Memorial Day weekend in 1934, his truck had a flat tire, so he pulled into a parking lot next to a pottery store and began selling his melting ice cream to vacationers who were driving by. The owner of the store allowed Carvel to use electricity from his store, so he opened his parked truck for ice cream sales. Within two days he had sold his entire supply of ice cream and concluded that he could increase his profits by working from a fixed location.

Founds Carvel Brand as a franchise
In 1936, Carvel purchased the pottery store and converted it into a roadside ice cream stand; this permanently established Carvel as the first retailer to develop and market soft ice cream.  The same year, he established the Carvel Brand Corporation and developed a secret soft-serve ice cream formula.

Carvel also developed new refrigeration machines and sold his designs. After World War II, he began to franchise his ice cream stores.

Carvel was featured in his own advertisements as the company believed that his gravelly voice and personal charm were important factors in the success of his business.

The Carvel company specialized in ice cream cakes, often in the shapes of animals. Two of the most popular ice cream novelties introduced by his business were "Fudgie The Whale" and "Cookie Puss".

Death and controversy

Carvel died in Pine Plains, Dutchess County, New York, in 1990 and is buried with his wife Agnes in Ferncliff Cemetery in Hartsdale, New York, which is only a couple of miles away from the spot where he began selling ice cream in 1929.

In October 2009, Carvel's niece Pamela Carvel filed court papers to have Carvel's body exhumed and an autopsy performed, stating she suspected he was drugged or suffocated by employees whom Carvel suspected of embezzlement. Her petition was denied, and she later became a fugitive from justice in a personal bankruptcy case. She had been vying for control of his 67-million-dollar estate.

See also
 Carvel Brand Ice Cream
 "Fudgie the Whale"
 "Cookie Puss"
 Franchising

References

External links
 Biography of Tom Carvel

1906 births
1990 deaths
Greek emigrants to the United States
People from Hartsdale, New York
American food company founders
Ice cream brands
People from Dutchess County, New York
Burials at Ferncliff Cemetery
20th-century American businesspeople
Businesspeople from Athens
American inventors
Greek Orthodox Christians from the United States